The "Better Boy" tomato variety is a hybrid between the Teddy Jones heirloom tomato variety and an unknown red variety developed by plant breeder John Peto. Better Boy tomatoes are resistant to both verticillium and fusarium wilt. Due to the relatively high amount of fruit it yields, it is recommended that the Better Boy varieties should be sturdily staked when planted in a garden.

See also
 List of tomato cultivars

References

Tomato cultivars